Liris Sol Velásquez is a Venezuelan politician who was a member of the National Assembly for the United Socialist Party of Venezuela (PSUV) and for the Bolívar state. She was a member of the parliamentary Permanent Family Commission and she also worked in the mayorship of the Caroní Municipality.

References

United Socialist Party of Venezuela politicians
Members of the National Assembly (Venezuela)
21st-century Venezuelan women politicians
21st-century Venezuelan politicians
Living people
Year of birth missing (living people)
Place of birth missing (living people)